Hinterland Bar and Food Carts, or simply Hinterland, is a bar and food cart pod in southeast Portland, Oregon. The pod opened in January 2022 and includes several food carts, including Burger Stevens, La Taquiza Vegana, Matt's BBQ Tacos, Poppyseed, and Third Culture Kitchen.

References

External links 

 
 

2022 establishments in Oregon
Food carts in Portland, Oregon
Mount Tabor, Portland, Oregon